Nicholas Hammond is an English ornithologist and author, and a former director of the Wildlife Trust for Bedfordshire, Cambridgeshire and Northamptonshire. He was editor of the Royal Society for the Protection of Birds' Birds magazine, and later its director of communications. He has written a number of books on, and speaks about, wildlife art.

RSPB 

Hammond undertook three stints as editor of the Royal Society for the Protection of Birds (RSPB) magazine Birds, from volume 1 number 7 – vol. 5 no. 5 (November/December 1966—September/October 1974); vol. 6 no. 6 – vol. 6 no. 9 (Spring-Winter  1977) and vol. 10 no. 3 – vol. 11 no. 1 (Autumn 1984-Spring 1986). He also served as the charity's director of communications.

Works

References 

English nature writers
English ornithologists
English magazine editors
Year of birth missing (living people)
Living people
Royal Society for the Protection of Birds people